The name Bogza may refer to:
 Sergey Bogza, Russian-American conductor
 Anda-Louise Bogza, Romanian opera soprano
 (Gheorghe) "Geo" Bogza (1908–1993), a Romanian poet, avant-garde theorist
 Lorena Bogza (born 1971), Romanian-born Moldovan journalist
 Nicolae Bogza (1910–1992), Romanian novelist

See also
 Bogza, a village in Sihlea Commune, Vrancea County, Romania

Romanian-language surnames